Mario Da Silva Pedreira Junior (born 3 May 1982) is a Brazilian male volleyball player. He was part of the Brazil men's national volleyball team at the 2010 FIVB Volleyball Men's World Championship in Italy. He played for Volley Piacenza. Mario in World League 2010 and Word League 2013 won Best Libero Award.

Clubs
 Volley Piacenza (2010)

Sporting achievements

Individuals

 2010 FIVB World League – "Best Libero"
 2011 Pan American Games – "Best Receiver"
 2013 FIVB World League – "Best Libero"
 2013 South American Championship – "Best Libero"

References

1982 births
Living people
Brazilian men's volleyball players
Place of birth missing (living people)
Pan American Games medalists in volleyball
Pan American Games gold medalists for Brazil
Volleyball players at the 2011 Pan American Games
Medalists at the 2011 Pan American Games
Liberos
Volleyball players from Rio de Janeiro (city)